Vincent François Damphousse (born December 17, 1967) is a Canadian former professional hockey player who played in the National Hockey League (NHL) for eighteen seasons. He played centre for the Toronto Maple Leafs, Edmonton Oilers, Montreal Canadiens and San Jose Sharks, winning a Stanley Cup championship with Montreal in 1993. He was signed as an unrestricted free-agent by the Colorado Avalanche in 2004 during the off-season, but he never played with the team due to the lockout that canceled the 2004–05 season.

Damphousse currently serves as a hockey analyst with the French-language television network RDS in his native Quebec.

Playing career
Damphousse was drafted by the Toronto Maple Leafs 6th overall in the 1986 NHL Entry Draft after a standout junior hockey career with the Laval Voisins/Titan. In 1991 he was named MVP of the NHL All Star Game, being one of only four players (at that time) to ever score 4 goals in a single All-Star matchup. Damphousse spent five seasons in Toronto before being traded to the Edmonton Oilers in 1991 in a deal which sent future Hall of Famers Grant Fuhr and Glenn Anderson to Toronto, while Edmonton received Damphousse, Peter Ing, Luke Richardson, Scott Thornton, cash, and future considerations in return. Oilers' general manager Glen Sather said of Damphousse at that time that among French-Canadian players, only Mario Lemieux was more skilled offensively.

On August 27, 1992, Damphousse was dealt to his hometown team, the Montreal Canadiens (with a 4th round pick in the 1993 NHL entry draft), in exchange for Shayne Corson, Brent Gilchrist and Vladimir Vujtek. His success with Montreal was immediate, as he recorded 97 points during the regular season and helped the team win the Stanley Cup in 1993. He spent six more seasons in Montreal before being traded on March 23, 1999 to the San Jose Sharks for a first, a second and a fifth round picks. He signed with the Colorado Avalanche on August 19, 2004, but he never played for them, as the 2004–05 NHL season was canceled due to the 2004–05 NHL lockout.

Damphousse was a member of the National Hockey League Players' Association (NHLPA) executive committee, serving as vice president under Trevor Linden.

Retirement
Damphousse announced his retirement on September 7, 2005. He currently lives in Montreal and serves as a hockey analyst with the French-language television network RDS.

Personal
On April 14, 2011, Damphousse was charged by Montreal police with six counts of assaulting his spouse after allegations made by his wife. The incidents were alleged to have occurred between January 2008 and early 2011. Damphousse categorically denied the allegations brought against him and also filed a complaint against his wife for assault. On June 19, 2013, the Crown dropped all charges against the ex-hockey player, though the Crown announced intentions to pursue its case against Allana Henderson, now Damphousse's ex-wife, for armed assault and theft under $5,000. Henderson was accused of committing assault with her vehicle and stealing a briefcase from her ex-husband. On January 14, 2015, the Crown dropped all charges against Henderson.

Awards
 QMJHL Second All-Star Team - 1986
 QMJHL Playoffs Most Assists (28) - 1986
 Selected to four NHL All-Star Games - 1991, 1992, 2001, 2002
 NHL All-Star Game MVP - 1991
 Stanley Cup champion - 1993 (Montreal)

Career statistics

Regular season and playoffs

International

See also 
List of NHL statistical leaders
List of NHL players with 1000 games played
List of NHL players with 1000 points

References

External links

1967 births
Canadian ice hockey centres
Edmonton Oilers players
French Quebecers
Ice hockey people from Montreal
Laval Titan players
Laval Voisins players
Living people
Montreal Canadiens players
National Hockey League All-Stars
National Hockey League first-round draft picks
San Jose Sharks players
Stanley Cup champions
Toronto Maple Leafs draft picks
Toronto Maple Leafs players